The 1932 New Hampshire gubernatorial election was held on November 8, 1932. Incumbent Republican John Gilbert Winant defeated Democratic nominee Henri Ledoux with 54.20% of the vote.

General election

Candidates
Major party candidates
John Gilbert Winant, Republican
Henri Ledoux, Democratic

Other candidates
Frank T. Butler, Socialist
William J. Wilgus Jr., Communist

Results

References

1932
New Hampshire
Gubernatorial